Lenin Square or Ploshchad Lenina may refer to:

Locations

Former
 Azadliq Square, Baku, Azerbaijan
 Dousti Square, Dushanbe, Tajikistan
 Freedom Square, Tbilisi, Georgia
 Independence Square, Gyumri, Armenia
 Independence Square, Minsk, Belarus
 Lukiškės Square, Vilnius, Lithuania
 Republic Square, Yerevan, Armenia
 Mustaqillik Maydoni, Tashkent, Uzbekistan
 Astana Square, Almaty, Kazakhstan

Current
 Lenin Square, Cavriago, Italy
 Lenin Square, Khabarovsk, Russia

Metro stations

In Russia 
 Ploshchad Lenina (St. Petersburg Metro)
 Ploshchad Lenina (Volgograd Metro)
 Ploshchad Lenina (Minsk Metro)
 Ploshchad Lenina (Novosibirsk Metro)
 Ploshchad Lenina (Ufa Metro)

Outside of Russia 
 Ploshchad Lenina (Donetsk Metro)
 Republic Square (Yerevan Metro)
 Mustaqilliq Maidoni (Tashkent Metro)
 Tavisuplebis Moedani (Tbilisi Metro)

See also
 List of places named after Vladimir Lenin